The 2001 Northeast Conference men's basketball tournament was held in March.  The tournament featured the league's top eight seeds. Monmouth won the championship, its second, and received the conference's automatic bid to the 2001 NCAA Tournament.

Format
The NEC Men’s Basketball Tournament consisted of the conferences top seven teams.  All games were played at Sovereign Bank Arena in Trenton, NJ.  The #1 seed received a bye for the first round.

Bracket

All-tournament team
Tournament MVP in bold.

References

Northeast Conference men's basketball tournament
Tournament
Northeast Conference men's basketball tournament